Listowiidae is a family of tapeworms.

References

Cestoda
Platyhelminthes families